Laponia was a historical Swedish province, or landscape, in the north of Sweden which evolved from Lappmarken. In 1809, Sweden ceded the eastern part, along with Finland, to the Russian Empire, which in effect created a Swedish Lapland and Finnish Lapland.

Today, the Swedish part serves no administrative purpose. On the Finnish side, there was a Province of Lapland (much larger to the south, especially by population, and where there were no Sami for many centuries) from 1938 until 2010, when Finnish provinces were discontinued, and the province was replaced by the Region of Lapland.

Lapland is considered in some nations — notably the United Kingdom, Ireland, Serbia, Sweden, Finland, Latvia, Romania and France — to be the home of Father Christmas (more widely known as Santa Claus).

Population

The current population of Swedish Lapland plus the municipalities Enontekiö (Eanodat), Inari (Ánar), Utsjoki (Ohcejohka), Muonio (Muoná), Kittilä (Gihttel) and Sodankylä (Soad'egilli) in Finnish Lapland constitutes 125,151 individuals. The largest city is Kiruna (Giron) with 18,154 inhabitants.

Historical districts 

Before being split, Laponia was divided into juridical districts which were:

 Arjeplog Lapland Court District
 Arvidsjaur Lapland Court District
 Enonteki Lapland Court District
 Gällivare Lapland Court District
 Jokkmokk Lapland Court District
 Jukkasjärvi Lapland Court District
 Lycksele Lapland Court District
 Norsjö and Malå Court District
 Åsele Lapland Court District

References

See also 
 Sápmi (the larger traditional territory of the Sámi, often mistakenly called "Lappland")

Former provinces of Sweden
Former provinces of Finland
Sápmi